Nanda Ghunti is a  mountain in Garhwal, India. It lies on the outer rim of the Nanda Devi Sanctuary.

The mountain was first surveyed by T. G. Longstaff in 1907. Eric Shipton surveyed it from the west in 1931. The first serious attempt to reach the summit was made by B. R. Goodfellow and J. Buzzard (UK) in 1944. Finally, a Swiss team under André Roch made the first ascent in 1947 via the east ridge.

The first Indian ascent was made in 1960. This expedition was organized by the Himalayan Institute of Kolkata under the leadership of Sukumar Roy and patronised by Ashok Kumar Sarkar of the Anandabazar Patrika. The approach was made via the east ridge, and the summit was reached on 22 October 1960. Summiters were Sukumar Roy, Dilip Banerjee, Ajeeba, Norbu, Ang Shering and Nima Tashi. Other team members  Dhruba Ranjan Majumder, Bishwadeb Biswas, Nimai Bose, Madan Mondol, Dr.Arun Kar, journalist Gour Kishore Ghosh and Photographer Biredra Nath Sinha.

Subsequent successful expeditions were conducted in 1977 and 1980.

Travellers get a clear view of Nanda Ghunti and Trishul en route to Roopkund in the Himalayas.

References

Mountains of Uttarakhand
Six-thousanders of the Himalayas